Maha Gaber Abouelenein is an Egyptian American communications consultant specializing in strategic communications, public diplomacy and campaign management. She was formerly the head of communications and spokeswoman for Google in Middle East and North Africa.

Life 
Abouelenein grew up in the United States, in a small town in Minnesota. Her parents immigrated to the United States from Egypt before she was born. Abouelenein is a Muslim. She has a sister, Amany, whom is a executive at General Mills. She holds a master's degree in communications from Minnesota State University, Mankato and an undergraduate degree in international business and marketing with a minor in French. 

In 1997, she returned to Egypt, where she began working for Sawiris. Years later, she established Weber Shandwick in the MENA region before leaving to start her business, Organizational Consultants. She also was the co-chair of the Women in Business Committee of the American Chamber of Commerce in Egypt.

Abouelenein joined Google after the Egyptian revolution of 2011. She left in 2014.

After leaving Google, she returned to consultancy, advising clients including Gary Vaynerchuk.

References

External links 

American consultants
American people of Egyptian descent
American public relations people
Businesspeople from Minnesota
Google employees
Living people
Minnesota State University, Mankato alumni
Spokespersons
Year of birth missing (living people)